PACS is an acronym with several meanings:

Medicine
Post-Acute COVID-19 Syndrome
Partial Anterior Circulation Stroke Syndrome, the symptoms of a type of an ischemic stroke
Picture Archiving and Communication System, a system used in medical imaging to store, retrieve, distribute, analyze, and digitally process medical images.

Organizations and establishments
Pacte civil de solidarité, a form of civil union in France
Palo Alto Chinese School, Palo Alto, California, USA
Poorest Areas Civil Society Program (2001–2008), a defunct Indian social welfare program
Primary Agricultural Credit Society, co-operative credit institutions in India
Provisional Army of the Confederate States, the "volunteer" or wartime-expansion component of the Confederate States Army

Child psychology
Phonological Assessment of Child's Speech, a type of analysis battery used in developmental psychology to ascertain if a child has a reading disorder.
Phonological Awareness Composite Scores, a marking criterion as part of the CTOPP assessment battery for assessing a child's awareness of the oral structure of language.

Physics and astronomy
Physics and Astronomy Classification Scheme, a scheme developed by the American Institute of Physics
Photodetecting Array Camera and Spectrometer, an instrument of the Herschel Space Observatory

PACs
PACs is the plural of PAC; for example:
Political action committees, groups organized to elect or defeat political candidates
Premature atrial contractions

Other
Primary airport control station, a survey marker established in the vicinity of an airport
Personal access control system. Gates, barriers and turnstiles that provide security for restricted areas on buildings and sites. 
Cape Sarichef Airport (ICAO airport code), on Unimak Island of the Aleutian Islands, Alaska
Peace and conflict studies, an academic field that identifies and analyzes violent and nonviolent behaviors of social conflicts